Cham-e Aseman (also Romanized as Cham-e Āsemān and Cham Asmān) is a village in Zirkuh Rural District, Bagh-e Bahadoran District, Lenjan County, Isfahan Province, Iran. At the 2006 census, its population was 110, in 30 families.

References 

Populated places in Lenjan County